Sport Club Guaraí, commonly known as Guaraí, is a Brazilian football club based in Guaraí, Tocantins state.

History
The club was founded on September 7, 1983. Guaraí won the Campeonato Tocantinense Second Level in 2010.

Achievements
 Campeonato Tocantinense Second Level:
 Winners (1): 2010

Stadium
Sport Club Guaraí play their home games at Estádio Delfino Pereira Lopes, nicknamed Delfinão. The stadium has a maximum capacity of 3,500 people.

References

Football clubs in Tocantins
Association football clubs established in 1983
1983 establishments in Brazil